The 1978 Edmonton Eskimos finished in 1st place in the Western Conference with a 10–4–2 record and won the 66th Grey Cup. It was Warren Moon's rookie season, and he replaced the injured Bruce Lemmerman as the backup quarterback and completed 89 of 173 passes for 1,112 yards and five touchdowns. He was Edmonton's nominee for the CFL's Most Outstanding Rookie Award.

Pre-season

Schedule

Regular season

Season Standings

Season schedule
The Eskimos played their first two regular season games at Clarke Stadium and their remaining six at Commonwealth Stadium.

Total attendance: 262,925 
Average attendance: 32,866 (76.8%)

Playoffs

Grey Cup

Awards and honours
CFL's Most Outstanding Defensive Player Award – Dave "Dr. Death" Fennell (DT)
Grey Cup Most Valuable Player (Offence) – Tom Wilkinson
Grey Cup Most Valuable Player (Defence) – Dave "Dr. Death" Fennell
Dave "Dr. Death" Fennell, Defensive Tackle, CFL All-Star
Danny Kepley, Linebacker, CFL All-Star

References

Edmonton Elks seasons
Grey Cup championship seasons
N. J. Taylor Trophy championship seasons
1978 Canadian Football League season by team